The Silverthorne Micropolitan Statistical Area is a United States Census Bureau defined Micropolitan Statistical Area located in the Silverthorne area of the State of Colorado.  The Silverthorne Micropolitan Statistical Area is defined as Summit County, Colorado.  The Micropolitan Statistical Area had a population of 23,548 at the 2000 Census. A July 1, 2009 U.S. Census Bureau estimate placed the population at 27,239.

The Silverthorne Micropolitan Statistical Area includes the Town of Silverthorne, the Town of Blue River, the Town of Breckenridge, the Town of Dillon, the Town of Frisco, the Town of Montezuma, and the unincorporated areas of Summit County.

See also
Summit County, Colorado
Colorado census statistical areas
Colorado metropolitan areas
Combined Statistical Area
Core Based Statistical Area
Metropolitan Statistical Area
Micropolitan Statistical Area
Table of United States Combined Statistical Areas
Table of United States Metropolitan Statistical Areas
Table of United States Micropolitan Statistical Areas
Table of United States primary census statistical areas
Census statistical areas adjacent to the Silverthorne Micropolitan Statistical Area:
Denver-Aurora Metropolitan Statistical Area
Denver-Aurora-Boulder Combined Statistical Area
Edwards Micropolitan Statistical Area

References

Micropolitan areas of Colorado